The Mykolaiv Regional Committee of the Communist Party of Ukraine, commonly referred to as the Mykolaiv CPU obkom, was the position of highest authority in the Mykolaiv Oblast, in the Ukrainian SSR of the Soviet Union. The position was created on September 22, 1937, and abolished in August 1991. The First Secretary was a de facto appointed position usually by the Central Committee of the Communist Party of Ukraine or the First Secretary of the Communist Party of Ukraine.

List of First Secretaries of the Communist Party of Mykolaiv

See also
Mykolaiv Oblast

Notes

Sources
 World Statesmen.org

Regional Committees of the Communist Party of Ukraine (Soviet Union)
Ukrainian Soviet Socialist Republic
History of Mykolaiv Oblast
1937 establishments in the Soviet Union
1991 disestablishments in the Soviet Union